is a former Japanese football player.

Playing career
Kamada was born in Osaka on 21 December 1982. He joined J1 League club Cerezo Osaka from youth team in 2001. He could not play at all in the match in J1 League and Cerezo was relegated to J2 League end of 2001 season. He debuted in 2001 Emperor's Cup in December and Cerezo won the 2nd place. In 2002, he played many matches as defensive midfielder and Cerezo was returned to J1 in a year. Although he became a regular player, he played many matches from 2003 and won the 2nd place 2003 Emperor's Cup. However he could hardly play in the match in 2005. In September 2005, he moved to J2 club Sagan Tosu on loan. He became a regular player soon and played many matches until 2006. In 2007, he returned to Cerezo which was relegated to J2 from 2007. He played many matches and Cerezo was promoted to J1 end of 2009 season. However he moved to J2 club Tokushima Vortis in 2010. He played as regular player and Vortis was promoted to J1 end of 2013 season first time in the club history. However Vortis finished at the bottom place in 2014 season and was relegated to J2 in a year. His opportunity to play decreased from 2016 season and he retired end of 2017 season.

Club statistics

References

External links

1982 births
Living people
Association football people from Osaka Prefecture
Sportspeople from Osaka
Japanese footballers
J1 League players
J2 League players
Cerezo Osaka players
Sagan Tosu players
Tokushima Vortis players
Association football midfielders